DeVaughn Akoon-Purcell (born June 5, 1993) is an Trinidadian-American professional basketball player for Lokomotiv Kuban of the VTB United League. He played college basketball for Eastern Oklahoma State and Illinois State.

College career 
Akoon-Purcell transferred from Eastern Oklahoma State College, where he was a National Junior College Athletic Association (NJCAA) Division I All-America Honorable Mention selection in 2014, to Illinois State University ahead of the 2014–15 season. During his junior season at Illinois State, Akoon-Purcell was named to the Missouri Valley Conference (MVC) All-Newcomer Team, and he was also named the MVC Newcomer of the Year. In 2014–15, he was also a finalist for the Riley Wallace Award, presented annually to the top transfer in NCAA Division I basketball, as awarded by CollegeInsider.com. Ahead of his senior season, Akoon-Purcell was a 2015–16 MVC Preseason Team selection. During his senior season at Illinois State, Akoon-Purcell led the team in scoring and ranked eighth in the MVC with 14.1 points per game on his way to earning All-MVC Second Team and NABC Division I District 16 Second Team accolades. Akoon-Purcell went undrafted in 2016.

Professional career

Bakken Bears (2016–2018)
In August 2016, Akoon-Purcell signed a one-year contract with Danish side Bakken Bears of the Basketligaen and FIBA Europe Cup. He led the Bears to a Basketligaen championship in his first season, while being named the league's MVP and Finals MVP. In his second season with the Bears, he reached the semi-finals of the FIBA Europe Cup and won the Basketligaen championship. Akoon-Purcell was given the title of Fan Vote FIBA Europe Cup MVP, as he received 4,939 fan votes. He also was named the Guard of the Year of the competition.

Denver Nuggets (2018)
Akoon-Purcell joined the Denver Nuggets NBA Summer League roster ahead of the 2018 Las Vegas Summer League, averaging 12.0 points, 2.0 rebounds, 1.5 assists and 2.0 steals in 19.3 minutes per game.  On August 7, 2018, the Denver Nuggets signed Akoon-Purcell on a two-way contract. Akoon-Purcell played in only 7 games with the Nuggets throughout the entirety of his two-way contract. On December 16, 2018, after the expiration of his two-way contract, he was waived by the Nuggets.

Hapoel Tel Aviv (2018–2019)
On December 19, 2018, Akoon-Purcell signed with Hapoel Tel Aviv of the Israeli Premier League for the rest of the season. However, on February 19, 2019, Akoon-Purcell parted ways with Hapoel after appearing in eight games.

ESSM Le Portel (2019)
On March 9, 2019, Akoon-Purcell signed with ESSM Le Portel of the French LNB Pro A. In 12 games played for Le Portel, he averaged 9.1 points and 2.5 rebounds per game.

Oklahoma City Blue (2019–2020)
On September 30, 2019, Akoon-Purcell signed with the Oklahoma City Thunder. He was cut from the team in the preseason and was signed by their G League affiliate, the Oklahoma City Blue. On January 21, 2020, Akoon-Purcell posted 33 points and 7 rebounds in a 125–116 win over the Austin Spurs. The following game, he scored 38 points while adding eight rebounds, two assists and one steal in a 144–140 loss to the Texas Legends.

Tofaş (2020–2021)
On September 2, 2020, Akoon-Purcell signed a one-month deal with the Bakken Bears. However on September 29, he signed with Tofaş of the Turkish league.

Akoon-Purcell played for the Atlanta Hawks in the 2021 NBA summer league, scoring 13 points in 27 minutes on 6–9 shooting and grabbing 8 rebounds and 2 steals at his debut in a 85–83 loss against the Boston Celtics and former Hapoel Tel-Aviv teammate Yam Madar.

Galatasaray (2021–2022)
On August 23, 2021, Akoon-Purcell signed a one year deal with Galatasaray Nef of the Turkish Basketbol Süper Ligi (BSL), with the option of an additional season.

Lokomotiv Kuban (2022–present)
On December 1, 2022, he signed with Lokomotiv Kuban of the VTB United League.

Career statistics

NBA

Regular season

|-
| align="left" | 
| align="left" | Denver
| 7 || 0 || 3.1 || .300 || .000 || .500	|| .5 || .8 || .2 || .0 || 1.0
|- class="sortbottom"
| style="text-align:center;" colspan=2| Career
| 7 || 0 || 3.1 || .300 || .000 || .500	|| .5 || .8 || .2 || .0 || 1.0

Domestic Leagues

|-
| align=left style="background:#afe6ba;style="text-align:center;" | 2016–17†
| style="text-align:left;" rowspan=2 |  Bakken Bears
| style="text-align:center;" rowspan=2| Basketligaen
|37 ||32 ||27.1 ||.522||.455||.799||5.9||3.0||1.8||.4 ||style="background:#CFECEC;"| 21.4*
|-
| align=left style="background:#afe6ba;style="text-align:center;" | 2017–18†
| 29 || 25 || 27.1 || .484 || .352 || .881 || 4.9 || 3.8 || 1.6 || .1 || 17.3
|-
| style="text-align:left;" | 2018–19
| style="text-align:left;" |  Hapoel Tel Aviv
| style="text-align:center;" | IPL
| 8 || 7 || 22.1 || .310 ||.240	|| .826	|| 2.6 || 1.8 ||1.1 ||.1 || 7.6
|-
| style="text-align:left;" | 2018–19
| style="text-align:left;" |  Le Portel
| style="text-align:center;" | Pro A
| 12 || 2 || 17.2 || .351 ||.300 || .680 || 2.5 || 1.1 ||0.8 ||.0 || 9.1
|-
|}

European Competitions

|-
| style="text-align:center;" |2016–17
| style="text-align:left;" rowspan=2 |  Bakken Bears
| style="text-align:center;" rowspan=1|  BCL
| 14 || 11 || 29.0 || .415 || .340 || .842 || 6.6 || 1.7 || 2.2 || .3 || 17.4
|-
| style="text-align:center;" |2017–18
| style="text-align:center;" rowspan=1|  FEC
| 18 || 18 || 32.7 || .415 || .255 || .718 || 5.2 || 4.3 || 1.6 || .0 || 18.6
|}

References

External links
Illinois State Redbirds bio
RealGM profile

1993 births
Living people
American expatriate basketball people in Denmark
American expatriate basketball people in France
American expatriate basketball people in Israel
American expatriate basketball people in Turkey
American men's basketball players
American sportspeople of Trinidad and Tobago descent
Bakken Bears players
Basketball players from Orlando, Florida
Delaware Blue Coats players
Denver Nuggets players
ESSM Le Portel players
Expatriate basketball people in Denmark
Galatasaray S.K. (men's basketball) players
Hapoel Tel Aviv B.C. players
Illinois State Redbirds men's basketball players
Junior college men's basketball players in the United States
National Basketball Association players from Trinidad and Tobago
Oklahoma City Blue players
PBC Lokomotiv-Kuban players
Small forwards
Tofaş S.K. players
Trinidad and Tobago expatriate sportspeople in Denmark
Trinidad and Tobago expatriate sportspeople in Israel
Trinidad and Tobago men's basketball players
Undrafted National Basketball Association players